Colin Thompson may refer to:

Colin Thompson (writer) (born 1942), English-Australian writer and children's book illustrator
Colin Thompson (American football) (born 1993), American football player
Colin Thompson (racing driver) (born 1994), American racing driver